Phaeosaces lindsayae is a species of moth in the family Depressariidae. It is endemic to New Zealand. It is classified as "Data Deficient" by the Department of Conservation.

Taxonomy
This species was described by Alfred Philpott in 1928 using specimens collected by Jean Lindsay at "Blackmillar" (Black Miller Stream), Kaikoura and named Crytopechia lindsayae. George Hudson discussed and illustrated the species under this name in 1939. In 1988 John S. Dugdale reinstated the genus Phaeosaces and assigned P. lindsayae to it. This species was named in honour of its first collector Mrs Jean Lindsay. The holotype specimen is held at the Canterbury Museum.

Description 
Philpott described the species as follows:

Distribution 
This species is endemic to New Zealand. It has only been collected at its type locality.

Biology and behaviour 
This species is on the wing in December.

Conservation status 
This species has been classified as having the "Data Deficient" conservation status under the New Zealand Threat Classification System.

References

External links
Image of holotype specimen

Moths described in 1928
Depressariidae
Moths of New Zealand
Endemic fauna of New Zealand
Endemic moths of New Zealand